Voyageurs Conservancy (formerly known at Voyageurs National Park Association) is a 501(c)(3) non-profit organization located in Minneapolis, Minnesota that works to protect and promote the natural, recreational, and historic resources of Voyageurs National Park.

Voyageurs Conservancy was established on May 5, 1965, by a group of citizens working to protect lands in the Rainy, Kabetogama, Namakan, and Sand Point Lakes region of northern Minnesota.  Their goal was to establish a national park that would recognize the important sociocultural history of the region and preserve the unique natural and scenic treasures it contained for the enjoyment of all Americans for generations to come.  The founders and early directors of Voyageurs National Park Association included former Minnesota Governor Elmer L. Andersen, Judge Ed Chapman, Wayne Judy, Martin Kellogg, Sigurd F. Olson, Wallace Dayton, and Wheelock Whitney.  These individuals and others led the organization in its efforts to lobby local, state, and federal legislators and to inform and educate the public about the importance and reasons for creating the park.

As a result of the work of Voyageurs Conservancy and many other groups and individuals, Voyageurs National Park was officially created in 1975.  Since then, Voyageurs National Park Association has continued as a citizens group working to promote and protect Voyageurs National Park, and as an informal partner with the National Park Service in the planning and development of the park.

External links
Official Voyageurs National Park Association website
Official Voyageurs National Park website

Non-profit organizations based in Minnesota
1965 establishments in Minnesota
Environmental organizations based in the United States
Organizations based in Minneapolis
Voyageurs National Park